Niemann is a Low German surname.  Notable people with the surname include:

Albert Niemann (chemist) (1834–1861), German chemist
Albert Niemann (paediatrician) (1880–1921), German physician
Albert Niemann (tenor) (1831–1917), German opera singer
Ben Niemann (born 1995), American football player
Brausch Niemann (born 1939), South African racing driver
Carl Niemann (1908–1964), American biochemist
Edmund John Niemann (1813–1876), British artist
Gunda Niemann-Stirnemann (born 1966), German speed skater
Hans Moke Niemann (born 2003), American chess grandmaster
Jeff Niemann (born 1983), American baseball player
Jerrod Niemann (born 1979), American country music singer
Joaquín Niemann (born 1998), Chilean golfer
Johan Niemann (born 1977), Swedish bassist
Johann Niemann (1913–1943), Nazi SS officer
Kristian Niemann (born 1971), Swedish guitarist
Nick Niemann (born 1997), American football player
Noel Niemann (born 1999), German footballer
Paige Niemann, American social media personality
Randy Niemann (born 1955), American baseball coach and player

See also
Niemann–Pick disease
Niemann-Pick disease, type C
Niemann-Pick disease, SMPD1-associated
Niemann Foods
Nieman (surname)
Neumann

Low German surnames